Dollern (German: Bahnhof or Haltestelle Dollern) is a rapid transit railway station, located in the village Dollern, Lower Saxony. The trains of the Hamburg S-Bahn serve the station on the line S3 from Pinneberg via Hamburg-Altona station and central station to Stade.

References 

Hamburg S-Bahn stations in Lower Saxony
Buildings and structures in Stade (district)
Railway stations in Germany opened in 1881